The Mole is an American reality game show that originally aired on ABC from 2001 to 2008 before being rebooted on Netflix in 2022. It is based on other versions of the original Belgian TV series De Mol that have aired in numerous countries. The Mole was produced by Stone Stanley Entertainment for its first four seasons. It was canceled but was later picked up again after a four-year hiatus. The fifth season was produced by Stone & Co. Entertainment. Netflix picked up the show after a fourteen-year hiatus. The sixth season premiered on October 7, 2022 and was produced by Eureka Productions.

The series is a reality competition in which the contestants work as a group to add money to a pot that only one of them will eventually win. Among the contestants is one person who has secretly been designated "the Mole" by the producers and is tasked with sabotaging the group's money-making efforts. At the end of each episode, the contestant who knows the least about the mole, as determined by the results of a multiple-choice quiz, is eliminated from the game. The last contestant standing wins the game and all of the money in the pot.

The series was first hosted by news reporter Anderson Cooper; for the third season, Ahmad Rashad replaced Cooper, and Rashad was in turn replaced by Jon Kelley for the fifth season. Alex Wagner hosted the show's reboot sixth season. The third and fourth seasons featured celebrity contestants instead of average citizens.

Format

Contestants
The contestants typically meet for the first time at or shortly before the start of filming, just before their first task. They are given black duffel bags with the show's thumbprint logo and their names on them in which to keep their belongings. Each contestant is also given a numbered journal; this is the only method by which contestants are permitted to record information and thoughts about the other contestants.

Missions
Each mission generally has a monetary reward towards the group pot for various levels of success. On occasion, a mission will have a cash penalty for failure. The missions comprise various physical and/or mental challenges posed to the contestants. While some are straightforward, with the rules and stakes fully explained to all contestants, on some occasions, not all aspects of the mission are fully explained to all contestants, increasing its difficulty. In those cases, perhaps only selected contestants are informed of the full nature of the challenge, and must work towards a different goal than the rest. In some instances, there are secret missions that only one or none of the contestants is aware of.

Some missions require every team member to complete their task for the team to earn money, while other missions award money to each contestant who finished, regardless of the others. A common requirement is for the team to divide themselves into groups based on given attributes (e.g., "leaders" & "followers," "smart" & "dumb") before they learn what the task is.

Secret missions may include "morality tests" where the players might be unexpectedly approached by a local (secretly arranged by the producers) for help (for instance, changing a tire for a stranded motorist). The contestants would later be informed that they won or lost the mission depending upon if they helped the person in need.

Penalties
In addition to challenges, violations of the game's rules by a player during certain seasons, such as going out after curfew or talking about a forbidden topic, can result in a deduction from the group pot as a penalty. Failing a secret "morality test" may also warrant a penalty. In some of the more difficult tasks, sometimes the players are given the opportunity to "buy" a clue(s) or "buy" extra time to complete the mission. Electing to do so takes a small amount of cash out of the amount they earn in that mission.

Quizzes & execution
At the end of each episode, all players (including the mole and any exempted players) take a multiple choice quiz about the identity of the mole. The questions reflect upon a variety of observations about the mole, including biographical information and what role(s) the mole took during that round's mission(s). Information from discussions, which the players open up to the others about their personal lives may also be included in questions. The final question of each quiz is always "Who is the Mole?", with all remaining players' names as options.

After dinner, all players (including the mole and anyone with an exemption) take the quiz in private on a computer, and then sit together for an "Execution Ceremony" (or "Elimination Ceremony" in season six). The player who scores the lowest on the quiz is eliminated from the game ("executed", in the show's parlance). If there is a tie for the lowest score among two or more players, the tied player who completed the quiz in the slowest elapsed time would be executed. The Mole is always safe from execution and is guaranteed to be involved in the game until the very end, though he/she can never win. The players who survive execution are not given their quiz scores or any additional information about the quizzes, and must deduce for themselves how well they are doing.

Exemptions
Contestants are sometimes awarded an "Exemption" from elimination or can win them in certain missions. An exempt contestant receives immunity from the next elimination. In some cases, exemptions are awarded to a single player for an exceptional effort or performance during that day's task. Sometimes the exempted player is chosen by the group, whether intentionally or unintentionally. Other times, the exemption comes in the form of a temptation to deliberately fail a task and forfeit money for the group pot; or as an unexpected consolation prize for failure during a task.

In some cases, the exemption is a secret element of a mission, revealed only to the player(s) eligible. A player(s) may find themselves surprisingly eligible to receive an exemption by committing a simple, innocuous act such as being the last person to leave the breakfast table or eating the last piece of pie at dessert. Likewise, that player's ploy to achieving the exemption is often unbeknownst to the other players.

In the second season, there was an additional element called the "Neutralizer" which prevented a contestant from being eligible for an exemption in that episode.

Seasons

Season 1

The first season of The Mole consisted of nine episodes, first aired from January 9 to February 28, 2001. It featured ten civilian contestants, one of whom was the Mole. The maximum possible value of the pot was $1,000,000, and each quiz consisted of twenty questions.

The contestants began the season in California, and traveled to France in the first episode. The remainder of the season took place in Europe, eventually traveling to Monaco, and Spain.

Season 2

Season 2 of The Mole was subtitled The Next Betrayal. Fourteen civilian contestants, one of whom was the Mole, competed over the course of 13 episodes. The first three episodes aired September 21 to October 12, 2001, before going on hiatus until the next summer, starting again from the first episode on May 24, 2002. The season again took place in Europe, mainly featuring Switzerland and Italy. The maximum possible pot was again $1,000,000, but the quizzes were shortened to 10 questions. Various other minor format elements were changed for the second season.

Season 3

Season 3 was billed Celebrity Mole: Hawaii and featured a cast of seven celebrities. The season, which was only six episodes long, was filmed on the Big Island of Hawaii. The possible maximum jackpot was also reduced to $250,000. The season aired from January 8 to February 12, 2003.

Season 4

The fourth season was billed Celebrity Mole: Yucatan, and featured eight celebrity contestants, including two returning from the previous season. The season was again a short seven episodes long, and was filmed on the Yucatán Peninsula in Mexico. The season aired from January 7 to February 18, 2004.

Season 5

The Mole returned after a four-year hiatus for a fifth season, returning to the civilian contestant format. Twelve contestants, one of whom was the mole, competed for a maximum pot of $500,000. The setting for this season was Argentina and Chile. The season aired from June 2 to August 11, 2008. This season received an Emmy nomination for best theme song composition.

Season 6

The Mole returned after a fourteen-year hiatus for a sixth season, switching over to Netflix. The season featured twelve contestants, one of whom was the Mole. The setting for this season was Australia, with Alex Wagner as host. The season aired for three weeks from October 7 to 21, 2022.

Future
Following the conclusion of Season 5 of The Mole, ABC did not comment on its consideration for a sixth season. On April 8, 2009, they announced that the show had been cancelled. Fans have also created their own private site to encourage the signing of an online petition, e-mailing ABC executives, as well as sending "lemon-heads" to ABC headquarters in New York. (This is in reference to an occurrence on the fifth season of the show.) The latter of these techniques for being noticed is in reference to the successful revival of the television drama Jericho on CBS by bombarding their offices with packages of peanuts. On May 3, 2021, BuzzerBlog posted an article seeming to confirm that a show known as The Insider on casting sites is likely a new season of The Mole filming in Australia in June and July 2021. Netflix added seasons 1 and 2 of The Mole to its US streaming library in June 2021, leading to speculation they will air a new season of the series. In a three-week release, the reboot of The Mole launched on Netflix on October 7, 2022. In February 2023, Netflix renewed the series for a seventh season.

References

External links 
 

2001 American television series debuts
2000s American reality television series
2020s American reality television series
American Broadcasting Company original programming
American television series based on Belgian television series
English-language Netflix original programming
 
Television series by Eureka
Television series by Stone Stanley Entertainment
American television series revived after cancellation